This is a list of sovereign states and dependent territories in Africa. It includes both fully recognised states, states with limited or zero recognition, and dependent territories of both African and non-African states. It lists 56 sovereign states (54 of which are member states of the United Nations), two non-sovereign (dependent) territories of non-African sovereign states, and ten sub-national regions of non-African sovereign states. Malta and parts of France, Italy, Portugal, and Spain are located on the African continental plate, some considerably closer to the African mainland than the European mainland but, politically, are generally considered to be European by convention. Egypt, although extending into Asia through the Sinai Peninsula, is considered an African state.

Sovereign states

Recognised states
The following 54 fully recognised states are all members of the United Nations and the African Union.

States with limited or no international recognition

The following two entities have declared themselves to be sovereign states and are in control of some territory but have limited or no recognition from other states. Neither entity is a member state of the United Nations, although the Sahrawi Arab Democratic Republic is a member of the African Union.

Non-sovereign territories
There are currently 12 non-sovereign territories in Africa. Except two Spanish autonomous cities and Peñón de Vélez de la Gomera, all the remaining territories are islands off the continent's coast.

Dependent territories

Other territories
This list contains 10 territories that are administered as incorporated areas of a primarily non-African country.

See also

 List of predecessors of sovereign states in Africa
 List of African countries by area
List of African countries by population
 List of African countries by population density
 List of African countries by GDP
 List of African countries by GDP (PPP)
 List of sovereign states and dependent territories in Eurasia

Notes

References

Africa-related lists
Africa
Africa